Koneline: Our Land Beautiful is a 2016 Canadian documentary film, directed by Nettie Wild and produced by Betsy Carson. The film explores the different lives of the Tahltan First Nations located in northern British Columbia. Through an objective lens, the audience experiences different perspectives from natives, miners, hunters, linesmen, geologists and tourists in Telegraph Creek. "Koneline" means "our land beautiful" in the Tahltan language.

Filming 
It took four years to film and one year to edit the documentary. The director, Nettie Wild, had to earn the trust from the Tahltan people. Wild gained permission by promising the Tahltan people that they could see the end product. The intention of the KONELĪNE is to be "cinematic poetry" where film captures an unbiased perspective without pushing any political message.

Awards 
The film premiered at the 2016 Hot Docs Canadian International Documentary Festival, where it won the award for Best Canadian Feature Documentary. It has also won the Audience Choice Award for Best Canadian Documentary at the 2016 Available Light Film Festival, and CSC Robert Brooks Award for Best Cinematography (Van Royko). The film garnered three Canadian Screen Award nominations at the 5th Canadian Screen Awards in 2017, for Best Feature Length Documentary, Best Cinematography in a Documentary and Best Editing in a Documentary.

References

External links
 
 
 Koneline: Our Land Beautiful at Library and Archives Canada

2016 films
2016 documentary films
Canadian documentary films
Documentary films about First Nations
Films directed by Nettie Wild
Tahltan
Films shot in British Columbia
2010s English-language films
2010s Canadian films